Gongmin of Goryeo (23 May 1330 – 27 October 1374), also known by his Mongolian name, Bayan Temür., was 31st ruler of Goryeo from 1351 to 1374. He was the second son of King Chungsuk.

Biography

Early life

Goryeo had been a semi-autonomous vassal state under the overlordship of the Mongol Yuan dynasty since the Mongol invasions of Korea in the 13th century. Starting with King Chungnyeol, prospective rulers of Korea married Mongolian princesses and were customarily sent to the Yuan Court, in effect, as hostages. As per this custom, King Gongmin spent many years in the Yuan court, being sent there in 1341, before ascending the Korean throne. He married a Mongolian princess who became Queen Noguk. The Yuan dynasty began to crumble during the mid-14th century, and was eventually conquered and replaced by the Ming dynasty in 1368.

Reign
With the disintegration of Yuan, which had forcibly allied the Korean peninsula since the 40 year long Mongol invasion of Korea of 1238, King Gongmin began efforts to reform Goryeo government. His first act was to remove all pro-Mongol aristocrats and military officers from their positions. These deposed people formed a dissident faction which plotted an unsuccessful coup against the king. High official Jo Il-shin even tried to take over the government, but this rebellion was put down by general Choe Young.

During the Mongol invasions of Korea, between the 1250s and the 1270s, the Mongols annexed the northern provinces of Korea and incorporated them into their empire as Ssangseong (쌍성총관부, 雙城總管府) and Dongnyeong Prefectures (동녕부, 東寧府). In 1356, the Goryeo army retook these provinces partly thanks to the defection of Yi Ja-chun, a minor Korean official in the service of the Mongols in Ssangseong, and his son, Yi Seong-gye. In addition, Generals Yi Seong-gye and Ji Yong-su led a campaign into Liaoyang.

Another issue was the question of land holdings. The land-grant system had broken down, and Mongol-favoured officials, along with a handful of landed gentry, owned the vast majority of agricultural landholdings, which were worked by tenant farmers and bondsmen. However, King Gongmin's attempt at land reform was met with opposition and subterfuge from officials who were supposed to implement his reforms, as they were landowners themselves.

The Wokou (Japanese pirates) were also a problem during King Gongmin's reign. Initially starting as 'hit-and-run' bandits, the Wokou evolved into well-organized military marauders raiding deep into the interior. Generals Choe Young and Yi Seong-gye were tasked to combat them.

Additionally, King Gongmin grappled with the Red Turban troops, who invaded Goryeo twice during his reign (first in 1359 and again in 1361). In 1361, the Red Turban troops occupied Kaesong for a short period of time.  After Kaesong was recaptured by Generals Choe Yeong, Yi Seong-gye, Jeong Seun, and Yi Bang-sil, few Red Turban troops escaped with their lives.
 
During the reign of King Gongmin, a Goryeo diplomat, Mun Ik-jeom, stationed in China, managed to smuggle cotton seeds into Goryeo, introducing cotton cultivation to the Korean peninsula.

Although the relationship between Queen Noguk and the king was very close, they failed to conceive an heir for many years. Despite suggestions of taking a second wife, King Gongmin ignored these requests. The king was also known to have entered into pederastic relationships with several court catamites, or chajewi, and the names of five of these are recorded as: Hong Yun, Han An, Kwon Chin, Hong Kwan, and No Son. Queen Noguk became pregnant but died from complications with childbirth in 1365. Her death led to King Gongmin's depression and mental instability. King Gongmin became indifferent to politics and entrusted the great tasks of state to Pyeonjo, a Buddhist monk who was born as the son of a princess and a slave. Judging him as clever, King Gongmin renamed Pyeonjo as Shin Don. Having the full confidence of King Gongmin, Shin Don tried to reform the society of Goryeo. In 1365, King Gongmin gave Pyeonjo the nickname "Cheonghan Geosa" and the noble title of Jinpyeonghu (Chinpyŏng Marquess). After six years, Shin Don lost his position, and King Gongmin had him executed in 1371. During his visits, the king had grown close to one of Shin Don's servants, Banya, with whom he had a son named Monino in 1365. After Shin Don's death, the boy was proclaimed heir apparent and it was claimed that his mother was a deceased palace maid.

Goryeo's entrenched bureaucracy never forgave King Gongmin for his reform efforts. They interpreted his policy of cutting all ties with the Yuan and establishing relations with Ming China as a direct threat to their status and feared that further attempts at reform might follow. Kaesong's deposed pro-Mongol faction battled to protect its position and hoped to renew ties with the Mongols.

Death
In 1374, King Gongmin was enraged to learn that one of his concubines had an affair with a young man named Hong Ryun (홍륜). Before Gongmin could arrange to have him killed, Hong Ryun and Choe Man-saeng (최만생) assassinated the king in his sleep.

After his death, a high official Yi In-im assumed the helm of the government and enthroned eleven-year-old, King U.

As an artist
King Gongmin was well known for his artistic skills, and he is referred to as one of the best artists of the Goryeo period. He was also well known for his calligraphy works.

Example of his works are:
"Painting of A Hunt in the Mountains of Heaven" 《天山大獵圖 (천산대렵도 Cheonsan Daeryeop Do)》
"Painting of Two Sheep" 《二羊圖 (이양도 I Yang Do)》
"Portrait of Princess Noguk" 《魯國大長公主真 (노국대장공주진 Noguk Daejang Gongju Jin)》
"Portrait of Yeom Je-shin 《廉悌臣象 (염제신상 Yeom Je-shin Sang)》, 1370's
"Portrait of Sohn Hong-ryang" 《孫洪亮象 (손홍량상 Sohn Hong-ryang Sang)》
"Portrait of Śākyamuni's Leaving Mountain" 《釋迦出山像 (석가출산상 Seokga Chulsan Sang)》
"Landscape of Epang Palace" 《阿房宮圖 (아방궁도 Ahbanggung Do)》
"Landscape of Hyeonneung" 《玄陵山水圖 (현릉산수도 Hyeonreung Sansu Do)》
"Portrait of Bodhidharma Crossing a River with a Broken Branch" 《達磨折蘆渡江圖 (달마절로도강도 Dalma Jeollo Dogang Do)》
Dongjabohyeon Yugabaeksang Do《童子普賢六牙白象圖 (동자보현육아백상도)》

Family
Parents
Father: Chungsuk of Goryeo (30 July 1294 — 3 May 1339)
Grandfather: Chungseon of Goryeo (고려 충렬) (20 October 1275 – 23 June 1325)
Grandmother:  Yasokjin, Royal Consort Ui (야속진 의비, died 1316),
Mother: Queen Gongwon of the Namyang Hong clan (공원왕후홍씨)(25 August 1298 — 12 February 1380)
Grandfather: Hong Gyu (홍규,1242–1316)
Grandmother:Grand Lady of Gwangju County of the Gwangju Kim clan (광주군대부인 김씨 ; 1258–1339)
Consorts and their respective issue(s):
Queen Indeok (노국대장공주)(d.8 March 1365) of Yuan Borjigin clan (보르지긴씨)
Unnamed son (died afterbirth)
Queen Sunjeong of the Goksan Han clan ( 순정왕후 한씨)
Royal Consort Hye of the Gyeongju Yi clan (혜비 이씨)(d.3 February 1408)
Royal Consort Sin of the Paju Yeom clan (신비 염씨)(d.1374)
Royal Consort Jeong of the Juksan An clan (정비 안씨)(1350 – 1428)
Royal Consort Ik of the Gaeseong Wang clan (익비 왕씨)
Banya (반야)
U of Goryeo (고려 우왕) (25 July 1365 – 31 December 1389 )

Popular depictions
 Portrayed by Im Hyuk in the 1983 KBS TV series Foundation of the Kingdom.
 Portrayed by Jeong Bo-seok in the 2005–2006 MBC TV series Shin Don.
 Portrayed by Joo Jin-mo in the 2008 film A Frozen Flower.
 Portrayed by Ryu Deok-hwan in the 2012 SBS TV series Faith.
 Portrayed by Ryu Tae-joon in the 2012–2013 SBS TV series The Great Seer.
 Portrayed by Kim Myeong-su in the 2014 KBS TV series Jeong Do-jeon.

See also
History of Korea
List of Korean monarchs
Tomb of King Kongmin
Korea under Yuan rule

References

Notes

1330 births
1374 deaths
14th-century murdered monarchs
14th-century Korean monarchs
Korean people of Mongolian descent
Leaders ousted by a coup
Leaders who took power by coup
Goryeo writers
Bisexual politicians
Korean LGBT people
Medieval LGBT people
LGBT royalty
Bisexual artists
Korean Buddhist monarchs
14th-century Korean painters
14th-century Korean calligraphers